Manuel F. Coronel was a Californio politician, who served in the California State Assembly and as the first official Zanjero of Los Angeles (water steward).
served as a member of the 1869–1871 California State Assembly, representing the 2nd District.

Life
He was the son of Ygnacio Coronel. His brother is Antonio F. Coronel, who served as Mayor of Los Angeles and California State Treasurer.

He was the first one appointed as Zanjero of Los Angeles (water steward) on April 3, 1854, but he resigned just two weeks later.

References

Members of the California State Assembly
Year of birth missing
Year of death missing